is a Japanese professional wrestler currently signed to New Japan Pro-Wrestling (NJPW).

Early life 
Before wrestling, Tsuji had played baseball, American football and had done Taekwondo.
In March 2012, he graduated from Yokohama Tateno high-school. In March 2016, Tsuji graduated from Nippon Sport Science University.

Professional wrestling career

New Japan Pro Wrestling (2017–present)
In April 2017, Tsuji was signed to New Japan Pro-Wrestling under New Japan's "young lion" system. A year later Tsuji as well as fellow young lion, Yuya Uemura, made their pro-wrestling debuts at Lion's Gate Project 11 where Tsuji was defeated by Tomoyuki Oka. In Yota's second match he was defeated by Ren Narita. During night one of Wrestling Dontaku 2018, Tsuji and Shota Umino were defeated by Chase Owens and Yujiro Takahashi of Bullet Club. At Lion's Gate Project 12, Tsuji and Yuya Uemura went to a time-limit draw. At Lion's Gate Project 13, Tsuji and Uemura wrestled to a draw. On September 5, at Aichi, Yota Tsuji teamed with Ren Narita to defeat Yuya Uemura and Shota Umino winning for the first time. After 3 years, New Japan reported that Tsuji would be going on overseas excursion along with Uemura as of August 1, 2021. In that day, Tsuji wrestled his last match as a Young Lion, facing Tetsuya Naito, with whom he had a minor feud with, in a losing effort.

Revolution Pro-Wrestling (2021–present)
It was announced by RevPro Wrestling that Tsuji would make his debut for the promotion on September 4. Tsuji wrestled his first match overseas in a losing effort against Kyle Fletcher.

References

External links
 

1993 births
Living people
Sportspeople from Yokohama
Japanese male professional wrestlers
Nippon Sport Science University alumni